Bălăneasa may refer to the following places in Romania:

 Bălăneasa, a village in the commune Livezi, Bacău County
 Bălăneasa, a tributary of the Bârlad in Vaslui and Galați Counties
 Bălăneasa (Buzău), a tributary of the Buzău in Buzău County